The 2020 season was Bodø/Glimt's third season back in the Eliteserien since their relegation at the end of the 2016 season. They finished as champions of the Eliteserien for the first time, and in turn qualified for the UEFA Champions League for the first time, whilst the Norwegian Cup was cancelled due to the COVID-19 pandemic in Norway. In Europe, Bodø/Glimt reached the Third Qualifying Round of the Europa League where they were knocked out by Milan.

Season events
On 12 June, the Norwegian Football Federation announced that a maximum of 200 home fans would be allowed to attend the upcoming seasons matches.

In June, Bodø/Glimt registered former goalkeeper, and current goalkeeping coach, Jonas Ueland Kolstad as a backup goalkeeper whilst waiting for new signing Joshua Smits to pass through the quarantine procedure for COVID-19 pandemic in Norway.

On 10 September, the Norwegian Football Federation cancelled the 2020 Norwegian Cup due to COVID-19 pandemic in Norway.

On 30 September, the Minister of Culture and Gender Equality, Abid Raja, announced that clubs would be able to have crowds of 600 at games from 12 October.

On 22 November, Bodø/Glimt defeated Strømsgodset 2-1 to clinch their first ever Eliteserien title.

Squad

Transfers

In

Out

Loans out

Released

Competitions

Eliteserien

League table

Results summary

Results by match

Results

Norwegian Cup

Europa League

Qualifying rounds

Squad statistics

Appearances and goals

|-
|colspan="14"|Players away from Bodø/Glimt on loan:
|-
|colspan="14"|Players who appeared for Bodø/Glimt no longer at the club:

|}

Goalscorers

Clean sheets

Disciplinary record

References

2020
Bodø/Glimt
Bodø/Glimt
Norwegian football championship-winning seasons